Solana Beach station, also known as the Solana Beach Transit Center, is a train station on Amtrak California's Pacific Surfliner passenger train and on North County Transit District's COASTER commuter rail route located in Solana Beach, California. The tracks were lowered to their current position in the late 90s, to alleviate congestion on Lomas Santa Fe Road and Downtown Solana Beach. There are two tracks that carry the Surf Line in a trench through the city of Solana Beach, including the station.

The station was designed by architect Rob Wellington Quigley, and was built in 1994 to replace the aging depot in Del Mar, California two miles south which had been in use since the early 1900s. Funding for the station included $2.8 million from Proposition 116, which was a ballot initiative that designated $1.99 billion for passenger rail projects. An additional $3.3 million used for land acquisition and design was obtained through Transnet, a half-cent county sales tax. Quigley drew inspiration for the design from a group of Quonset huts that used to line North Cedros Avenue in the 1940s. To the basic semi-circular form of the hut, the architect added a tower reminiscent of those found on many train depots dating to the second half of the 19th century.

In the late 1990s, an $18 million project lowered the tracks and station platforms. This allowed for another track and platform and improved safety by eliminating the railroad crossing located south of the station.

Solana Beach and the North County Transit District would like to convert the station and some of the adjacent surface parking into offices, a restaurant and an underground parking structure. This could involve the station being repurposed or demolished with ticket sales and other train services moved to the train track level. The parking garage could complement the Cedros Design District and adjacent Coast Highway 101.

Of the 73 California stations served by Amtrak, Solana Beach was the tenth-busiest in FY2010, boarding or detraining an average of approximately 1100 passengers daily.

Former Amtrak station at Del Mar

The former Del Mar station served passengers from the early 1900s until its closure in 1995, and for much of that time was the only passenger stop between Oceanside and San Diego. Solana Beach station was planned from the beginning not only as a stop for both Amtrak and commuter trains, but also as a major local bus hub. As a result, the future of Del Mar station, just two miles south, fell into doubt as early as 1989. At that time a committee of the San Diego Association Of Governments (SANDAG) voted in favor of its closure, citing the limited availability of parking, the lack of handicapped access, and the logistical difficulty accommodating bus and shuttle service. Any one of these problems, by itself, would have been a serious deficiency if Del Mar was to serve both commuters and Amtrak passengers.  The Del Mar City Council rejected any significant expansion of the facility, while still hoping to keep it in operation as an Amtrak-only station, but Amtrak rejected this possibility, deciding in favor of Solana Beach instead. Today, the former station and its platform are still kept intact next to the active railroad, and it is often leased out for weddings or other special events.

References

External links

COASTER Stations
Solana Beach Amtrak-Coaster Station – USA RailGuide (TrainWeb)

Amtrak stations in San Diego County, California
North County Transit District stations
Solana Beach, California
Railway stations in the United States opened in 1995
1995 establishments in California